The following is a list of defunct universities and colleges in Nebraska. This list includes accredited, degree-granting institutions and bona fide institutions of higher learning that operated before accreditation existed. All have hosted their primary campus within the state of Nebraska, and all have since discontinued operations or their operations were taken over by another similar institution of higher learning. Nebraska College of Business also known as Omaha College of Health Careers.  This institution lost its accreditation in the healthcare portion and subsequently closed. Leaving the travel agency careers open and others.

Defunct colleges

See also
 List of colleges and universities in Nebraska
 Higher education in the United States
 List of American institutions of higher education
 List of colleges and universities

References

Nebraska
Colleges